Ardauli is a comune (municipality) in the Province of Oristano in the Italian region Sardinia, located about  north of Cagliari and about  northeast of Oristano.

Ardauli borders the following municipalities: Ghilarza, Neoneli, Nughedu Santa Vittoria, Sorradile, Tadasuni, Ula Tirso.

References

Cities and towns in Sardinia